Steven Lee Nelson (born April 26, 1951) is an American former professional football player and high school coach. He played as a linebacker for the New England Patriots of the National Football League (NFL) from 1974 to 1987. He served as the head coach at Curry College in Milton, Massachusetts from 1998 to 2005, compiling a record of 64–22.

Nelson was a three-sport athlete at Anoka High School, in Anoka, Minnesota, earning letters in football, basketball and baseball. As a senior, Nelson was selected as captain, team MVP and to the all-state team in football. Nelson went on to college at North Dakota State University and graduated in 1974 after being named a two-time All-American, team captain and MVP in football.

He was selected by the Patriots in the second round of the 1974 NFL Draft. He was selected to the Pro Bowl three times in 1980, 1984, and 1985 and his #57 jersey was retired by the Patriots. He is credited with helping the Patriots reach Super Bowl XX versus the Chicago Bears.

Nelson played linebacker for the Patriots from 1974 to 1987 and became the nucleus of the Patriots defense. Nelson was voted to three Pro Bowls and recorded more than 100 tackles nine times during his career. He led the Patriots in tackles in eight of his 14 seasons, including an unofficial team record of 207 in 1984. He finished his career with 1,776 total tackles. After retirement, he coached for the Patriots and later built Curry College into a perennial power. In 1993, Nelson was inducted into the Patriots Hall of Fame.

More recently, Nelson has become a familiar football analyst on local television and radio. He currently works as a business development executive for Lighthouse Computer Services, Inc., a Lincoln, RI-based technology company. In September 2011, Nelson was named to the inaugural class of the Anoka High School Hall of Fame.

Head coaching record

See also
 Snowplow Game (game ball given to Nelson)

References

External links
 New England Patriots bio
 

1951 births
Living people
American football linebackers
American sports announcers
Curry Colonels athletic directors
Curry Colonels football coaches
New England Patriots coaches
New England Patriots players
North Dakota State Bison football players
American Conference Pro Bowl players
Anoka High School alumni
People from Anoka, Minnesota
People from Farmington, Minnesota
Coaches of American football from Minnesota
Players of American football from Minnesota
National Football League players with retired numbers
Ed Block Courage Award recipients